Kentucky Route 93 (KY 93) is a 27.734-mile (44.634 km) state highway in Kentucky that is separated into two segments. The southern segment runs from Kentucky Route 139 and Kentucky Route 276 southeast of the unincorporated community of Lamasco to Kentucky Route 810, Kentucky Route 819, and Iuka Ferry Road northwest of Kuttawa via Lamasco, Confederate, and Eddyville. The northern segment runs from Kentucky Route 917 and Short Drive just east of Iuka to Kentucky Route 453 in rural Livingston County several miles east of Iuka via Iuka. It appears that the two segments were originally or meant to be connected, as both segments are just a few miles apart. It appears that they were to connect at the Cumberland River, at which the northern segment ends on the western bank and a rural road, likely what was or is to be part of KY 93, ends on the east bank.

Major intersections

References

0093
Transportation in Lyon County, Kentucky
Transportation in Livingston County, Kentucky